Thomas Neville or variant spellings may refer to:
 Thomas Neville (died 1460) (c. 1429 – 1460), Yorkist captain during the early years of the Wars of the Roses
 Thomas Neville (died 1471) (1429–1471), rebel during the Wars of the Roses
 Thomas Nevill (c. 1484 – 1542), English Speaker of the House of Commons in 1515
 Thomas Nevile (died 1615), English clergyman and academic
 Thomas Nevill (priest) (1901–1980), English Anglican priest and school teacher
 Tom Neville (hurler) (1939–2018), Irish retired hurler
 Tom Neville (offensive tackle) (born 1943), American football offensive tackle
 Tom Neville (guard) (1961–1998), former guard in the National Football League
 Tom Neville (politician) (born 1975), Irish politician
 Tom Neville (musician), British musician featured on With the Music I Die
 Thomas Neville of Brancepeth (born before 1439), father of Humphrey Neville of Brancepeth

Fictional  
 Tom Neville, a character in Revolution

See also